= Adomiškės =

Adomiškės may refer to several locations in Lithuania:

- Adomiškės, Akmenė District
- Adomiškės, Marijampolė Municipality
- Adomiškės, Šalčininkai District
